In number theory, the sum of the first  cubes is the square of the th triangular number. That is,

The same equation may be written more compactly using the mathematical notation for summation:

This identity is sometimes called Nicomachus's theorem, after Nicomachus of Gerasa (c. 60 – c. 120 CE).

History
Nicomachus, at the end of Chapter 20 of his Introduction to Arithmetic, pointed out that if one writes a list of the odd numbers, the first is the cube of 1, the sum of the next two is the cube of 2, the sum of the next three is the cube of 3, and so on.

Many early mathematicians have studied and provided proofs of Nicomachus's theorem.  claims that "every student of number theory surely must have marveled at this miraculous fact".  finds references to the identity not only in the works of Nicomachus in what is now Jordan in the first century CE, but also in those of Aryabhata in India in the fifth century, and in those of Al-Karaji circa 1000 in Persia.  mentions several additional early mathematical works on this formula, by Al-Qabisi (tenth century Arabia), Gersonides (circa 1300 France), and Nilakantha Somayaji (circa 1500 India); he reproduces Nilakantha's visual proof.

Numeric values;  geometric and probabilistic interpretation

The sequence of squared triangular numbers is

These numbers can be viewed as figurate numbers, a four-dimensional hyperpyramidal generalization of the triangular numbers and square pyramidal numbers.

As  observes, these numbers also count the number of rectangles with horizontal and vertical sides formed in an  grid. For instance, the points of a  grid (or a square made up of three smaller squares on a side) can form 36 different rectangles. The number of squares in a square grid is similarly counted by the square pyramidal numbers.

The identity also admits a natural probabilistic interpretation as follows. That is, . The probabilities themselves are respectively the left and right sides of the Nichomachus identity, normalized to make probabilities by dividing both sides by .

Proofs
 gives a particularly simple derivation, by expanding each cube in the sum into a set of consecutive odd numbers. He begins by giving the identity 

That identity is related to triangular numbers  in the following way:

Applying this property, along with another well-known identity:

produces the following derivation:

 obtains another proof by summing the numbers in a square multiplication table in two different ways. The sum of the th row is  times a triangular number, from which it follows that the sum of all the rows is the square of a triangular number. Alternatively, one can decompose the table into a sequence of nested gnomons, each consisting of the products in which the larger of the two terms is some fixed value. The sum within each gmonon is a cube, so the sum of the whole table is a sum of cubes.

In the more recent mathematical literature,  provides a proof using summation by parts.  uses the rectangle-counting interpretation of these numbers to form a geometric proof of the identity (see also ); he observes that it may also be proved easily (but uninformatively) by induction, and states that  provides "an interesting old Arabic proof".  provides a purely visual proof,  provide two additional proofs, and  gives seven geometric proofs.

Generalizations
A similar result to Nicomachus's theorem holds for all power sums, namely that odd power sums (sums of odd powers) are a polynomial in triangular numbers.
These are called Faulhaber polynomials, of which the sum of cubes is the simplest and most elegant example.
However, in no other case is one power sum a square of another.

 studies more general conditions under which the sum of a consecutive sequence of cubes forms a square.  and  study polynomial analogues of the square triangular number formula, in which series of polynomials add to the square of another polynomial.

Notes

References

.
.
.

.
.
.
.
.
.
.
.
.
.
.

External links

A visual proof of Nicomachus's theorem 

Elementary mathematics
Number theory
Integer sequences
Mathematical identities
Articles containing proofs
Proof without words